Paterson Consolidated Brewing Company is a conglomerate brewery that came about in 1890 with the union of four breweries Braun Brewery, Sprattler & Mennell, Graham Brewery, The Katz Brothers, and Burton Brewery after an English syndicate offered to buy them out.

History

Braun Brewery

Founded by Christian Braun in 1855 on the corner of Braun and Marshall Street in Paterson. The brewery was very successful and even leased its space to Sprattler & Mennell. When Christian died in 1876 his sons Christian Jr. and Luis took over. At its peak it was producing 6,000 barrels a year.

Sprattler & Mennel

German immigrants Gustav Sprattler and Christian Mennel formed Sprattler & Mennel in 1870 while leasing space from Braun Brewery. In 1876 they moved to their own location on Marshall Street all the way to the Morris and Essex canals. Gustav died in 1885 and Mennel became sole owner. At their peak they brewed 40,000 barrels a year.

Graham Brewery
James Graham worked at several breweries for over nine years before opening his own brewery in 1887. His brewery was located in the center of the city at next to the New York, Lake Erie & Western Railroad.

The Katz Brothers and The Burton Brewery
The Burton Brewery began as Katz Brothers, founded by Philip and Bernard Katz in 1877. The original location was on the corner of Godwin and Bridge Street. The Katz Brewery was very successful, but their operation was inadequate; however, they lucked out when Burton Brewery, one of the largest breweries in the state, went up for sale. The Katz Brothers purchased Burton in 1882. The Burton XXX, Morlein's Premium, and Canada Malt Ale were distributed around the country. In 12 years Katz Brothers had grown to 130,000 barrels a year.

Consolidation

In 1890 the four breweries came together after an English syndicate offered to buy them out. The negotiations ultimately failed, but it still brought the four brewery owners together and made them realize the advantages if they united. The president was Bernard Katz, VP Philip Katz, second VP James Graham, Christian Mennel Treasurer, Luis Braun Secretary, and Christian Braun as Head Brewer. The firm ceased operations in 1920 when prohibition in the United States went into effect. Sprettler & Mennel attempted to revive the brand in 1939, but were not able to maintain a foothold and ceased operations in 1941.

See also
 Alcohol laws of New Jersey
 Beer in New Jersey
 Beer in the United States
 Hinchliffe Brewing
 List of wineries, breweries, and distilleries in New Jersey

References

Defunct brewery companies of the United States
Beer brewing companies based in New Jersey
Beer brewing companies based in Passaic County, New Jersey